Rhondda  may refer to:
 Rhondda, or the Rhondda Valley, a former coal mining valley in Wales
River Rhondda river in South Wales
Rhondda Fawr the larger of the two valleys in the Rhondda
Rhondda Fach the smaller of the two valleys in the Rhondda
Rhondda Cynon Taf, a county borough in Glamorgan, South Wales

Political wards and constituencies

Rhondda (UK Parliament constituency), a constituency of the House of Commons of the Parliament of the United Kingdom from 1885 to 1918, and from 1974 to present
Rhondda East (UK Parliament constituency), created in 1918, abolished in 1974
Rhondda West (UK Parliament constituency), created in 1918, abolished in 1974
Rhondda (Senedd constituency), a constituency of the Senedd
Rhondda (district), a former local government district in Wales
Rhondda (Pontypridd electoral ward), an electoral division of Rhondda Cynon Taf county borough council, Wales

Other uses
Cwm Rhondda, a hymn tune, after the Welsh name of the Rhondda Valley.
Glan Rhondda, the original name of the Welsh National Anthem, Hen Wlad fy Nhadau.
Viscount Rhondda, a title in the Peerage of the United Kingdom

People with the given name Rhondda
Rhondda Bosworth (born 1944), New Zealand photographer and artist
Rhondda Gillespie (1941 – 2010), Australian classical pianist
Rhondda Jones, Australian zoologist
Rhondda Alder Kelly (1926-2014), Australian model

See also
Rhonda, given name